Lilla is a given name and surname.

Lilla may also refer to:
 Lilla, Jhelum, a village in Punjab, Pakistan
 Lilla clan, an ethnic group of Pakistan
 Lilla Karlsö, a Swedish island in the Baltic Sea
 Lilla Edet, a locality in Västra Götaland County, Sweden
 Lilla Bommen, a skyscraper in the Lilla Bommen district of Gothenburg, Sweden

See also 
 Lila (disambiguation)